Retrato de la Burguesía (English: Portrait of the Bourgoisie) is a mural painting by David Alfaro Siqueiros and Josep Renau, created for the Mexican Electricists Syndicate to be painted in their main headquarters, located in the Antonio Caso Street, 45, in Ciudad de México.

The mural is generally regarded as a work by Siqueiros, but it was finished by Renau (and his wife, Manuela Ballester) after the Mexican artist had to flee when he was involved in an attempt to assassinate Leon Trotsky. Most of the photographic documentation and basic images in the Mural belongs to the Valencian artist, whose influence can be found in the photomontage technique, the constructivist inconography in the roof, and the finishing.

After its completion, Josep Renau started to work in his unifinished work La Marcha del proletariado, also known as La electrificación total de México acabará con la miseria del pueblo, being a project for a new mural for the same labor syndicate.

References 

Murals in Mexico
Works by David Alfaro Siqueiros
1930s murals
1939 paintings